John Wesley Stambaugh (July 1, 1887  – March 20, 1970) was a farmer and Canadian Senator.

Born in Melvin, Michigan United States, Wesley was appointed to the Senate of Canada on the advice of Prime Minister Louis St-Laurent on September 7, 1949, he served in the senate until June 8, 1965.

Wesley served as president of the Alberta Liberal Party from 1949 to 1956.

External links
 
Una Maclean fonds Glenbow museum

1887 births
1970 deaths
Liberal Party of Canada senators
Canadian senators from Alberta
American emigrants to Canada